AEK Boco Football Club is a football club based in Bristol, England.

History
AEK Boco were founded in 2003 as a result of the merger of AEK Rangers and Boco Juniors. The club later joined the Bristol Premier Combination, joining the Gloucestershire County League in 2014, finishing runners-up in their first season in the league. AEK Boco won the league in the 2015–16 season. In 2021, the club was admitted into the Western League Division One.

Ground
The club currently play at Greenbank Road in Bristol.

References

Association football clubs established in 2003
2003 establishments in England
Football clubs in England
Football clubs in Bristol
Bristol Premier Combination
Gloucestershire County Football League
Western Football League